The list of ship launches in 2012 includes a chronological list of ships launched in 2012.


See also

References

Ship launches

2012
Ship